Feng Yun may refer to:

Feng Yun (Later Tang), minister of the Later Tang
Feng Yun (Go player) (born 1966), Chinese professional Go player
Feng Yun (hurdler) (born 1976), female Chinese hurdler
Fung Wan, a comic series from Hong Kong
The Storm Riders, a 1999 Hong Kong film
Wind and Cloud, a 2002 Taiwanese TV series
Wind and Cloud 2, a 2004 Taiwanese TV series, sequel to the 2002 TV series
Storm Rider Clash of the Evils, a 2008 Chinese-Hong Kong animated film
The Storm Warriors, a 2009 Hong Kong film, sequel to the 1999 film

See also
Fengyun, China's weather satellites
Yun Feng, a cruise missile in development in Taiwan